Zitak Qeshlaq (also Romanized as Zītak Qeshlāq; also known as Zītak) is a village in Ilat-e Qaqazan-e Sharqi Rural District, Kuhin District, Qazvin County, Qazvin Province, Iran. At the 2006 census, its population was 92, in 20 families.

References 

Populated places in Qazvin County